Ismaël Aaneba (born 29 May 1999) is a French professional footballer who plays as a right-back for Ligue 2 club Sochaux.

Club career

Strasbourg 
A youth product of Mantes, Aaneba moved to Strasbourg on 30 October 2018. He made his professional debut with the club in a 2–0 Coupe de la Ligue win over Lille on 20 October 2018.

Sochaux 
On 10 June 2021, Aaneba signed a three-year contract with Sochaux.

International career
Born in France, Aaneba is of Moroccan descent and was called up to the Morocco U20s in October 2017. He is a youth international for France.

Honours 
Strasbourg

 Coupe de la Ligue: 2018–19

References

External links
 
 
 
 

1999 births
People from Mantes-la-Jolie
Footballers from Yvelines
French sportspeople of Moroccan descent
Living people
French footballers
France youth international footballers
Association football fullbacks
RC Strasbourg Alsace players
FC Sochaux-Montbéliard players
Ligue 1 players
Ligue 2 players
Championnat National 2 players
Championnat National 3 players